"Retrograde" is a song by English electronic music producer and singer-songwriter James Blake. The song was released as a digital download on 11 February 2013 as the lead single from his second studio album Overgrown (2013). The song was written, produced and recorded by Blake, and the music video was directed by Martin de Thurah.

Chart performance

Weekly charts

Certifications

Release history

In pop culture

The song is featured in several episodes of television shows, including: the extended trailer for season one of The Leftovers, as well as in the pilot episode; the 5th season of The Blacklist; season 1, episode 2 of the Italian Netflix series Baby; season 3, episode 6 of the series Suits; and the episode "Falling Angels – Part 1" of the BBC series Silent Witness.

The song also appears in the fifth episode of the video game Tales from the Borderlands.

Covers

It was covered by Australian singer Karen Lee Andrews in her 2013 EP, White Dress and the Spirit, under her former stage name, Ms Murphy.

References

2013 singles
James Blake (musician) songs
Songs written by James Blake (musician)
2013 songs